Suzanne Italiano (born 19 March 1973) is a former professional tennis player from Canada.

She has career-high WTA rankings of 265 in singles, achieved on 10 February 1992, and 356 in doubles, reached on 6 May 1991.

She made her WTA Tour main-draw debut at the 1990 Canadian Open.

ITF finals

Singles (2–1)

Doubles (0–3)

References

External links 
 

1973 births
Canadian female tennis players
Living people